Formiguères is a commune in the Pyrénées-Orientales department in southern France.

Its inhabitants are called Formiguérois.

Geography 
Formiguères is located in the canton of Les Pyrénées catalanes and in the arrondissement of Prades.

Population

See also
Communes of the Pyrénées-Orientales department

References

Communes of Pyrénées-Orientales